Pedranópolis is a municipality in the state of São Paulo in Brazil. The population is 2,481 (2020 est.) in an area of 260 km². The elevation is 475 m.

References

Municipalities in São Paulo (state)